Conasprelloides is a subgenus  of sea snails, marine gastropod mollusks in the family Conidae, the cone snails and their allies.

In the new classification of the family Conidae by Puillandre N., Duda T.F., Meyer C., Olivera B.M. & Bouchet P. (2015), Conasprelloides has become a subgenus of Conus: Conus (Dauciconus) Cotton, 1945 represented as Conus Linnaeus, 1758

Distinguishing characteristics
The Tucker & Tenorio 2009 taxonomy distinguishes Conasprelloides from Conus in the following ways:

 Genus Conus sensu stricto Linnaeus, 1758
 Shell characters (living and fossil species)
The basic shell shape is conical to elongated conical, has a deep anal notch on the shoulder, a smooth periostracum and a small operculum. The shoulder of the shell is usually nodulose and the protoconch is usually multispiral. Markings often include the presence of tents except for black or white color variants, with the absence of spiral lines of minute tents and textile bars.
Radular tooth (not known for fossil species)
The radula has an elongated anterior section with serrations and a large exposed terminating cusp, a non-obvious waist, blade is either small or absent and has a short barb, and lacks a basal spur.
Geographical distribution
These species are found in the Indo-Pacific region.
Feeding habits
These species eat other gastropods including cones.

 Subgenus Conasprelloides Tucker & Tenorio, 2009
Shell characters (living and fossil species)
The shell is turbinate to elongate conical in shape.  The protoconch is paucispiral, the body whorl has ridges, and the whorl tops have nodules that may persist on later whorls.  The anal notch is deep. The color pattern is simple and without clear spiral lines. The periostracum is tufted, and the operculum is small.  Similar to Gladioconus, however the species in this genus do not retain nodules into their outer whorls, and do not have well developed darker brown markings on the whorl tops beyond the early whorls.
Radular tooth (not known for fossil species)
The anterior section of the radula is usually shorter than posterior section.  The blade is indistinct but long and covers most of the length of the anterior section of the radular tooth.  A basal spur is present, and the barb is short.  The radular tooth has serrations and the terminating cusp is internal.
Geographical distribution
These species are found in the West Atlantic..
Feeding habits
These species are presumed to be vermivorous (meaning that they prey on marine worms) based upon the aspect of the radular tooth.  Several published studies consider these species vermivores, discussing a unique conopressin in the venom chemistry, without providing details on their diet.

Species
This list of species is based on the information in the World Register of Marine Species (WoRMS) list. Species within the subgenus Conasprelloides include:

 Conasprelloides brunneobandatus (Petuch, 1992): synonym of Conus brunneobandatus Petuch, 1992
 Conasprelloides cancellatus (Hwass in Bruguière, 1792): synonym of  Conus cancellatus Hwass in Bruguière, 1792
 Conasprelloides coltrorum Petuch & R. F. Myers, 2014: synonym of Conus coltrorum (Petuch & R. F. Myers, 2014)
 Conasprelloides hazinorum Petuch & Myers, 2014: synonym of  Conus hazinorum (Petuch & Myers, 2014) (alternate representation)
 Conasprelloides kevani (Petuch, 1987): synonym of  Conus kevani Petuch, 1987
 Conasprelloides kremerorum (Petuch, 1988): synonym of  Conus kremerorum Petuch, 1988
 Conasprelloides leekremeri (Petuch, 1987): synonym of  Conus leekremeri Petuch, 1987
 Conasprelloides levistimpsoni Tucker, 2013: synonym of Conus levistimpsoni (Tucker, 2013)
 Conasprelloides penchaszadehi (Petuch, 1986): synonym of  Conus penchaszadehi Petuch, 1986
 Conasprelloides stimpsoni (Dall, 1902): synonym of  Conus stimpsoni Dall, 1902
 Conasprelloides venezuelanus (Petuch, 1987): synonym of  Conus venezuelanus Petuch, 1987
 Conasprelloides villepinii (P. Fischer & Bernardi, 1857): synonym of  Conus villepinii P. Fischer & Bernardi, 1857

Significance of "alternative representation"
Prior to 2009, all species within the family Conidae were placed in one genus, Conus. In 2009 however, J.K. Tucker and M.J. Tenorio proposed a classification system for the over 600 recognized species that were in the family. Their classification proposed 3 distinct families and 82 genera for the living species of cone snails. This classification was based upon shell morphology, radular differences, anatomy, physiology, cladistics, with comparisons to molecular (DNA) studies. Published accounts of genera within the Conidae that include the genus Conaspelloides include J.K. Tucker & M.J. Tenorio (2009), and Bouchet et al. (2011).

Testing in order to try to understand the molecular phylogeny of the Conidae was initially begun by Christopher Meyer and Alan Kohn, and is continuing, particularly with the advent of nuclear DNA testing in addition to mDNA testing.

However, in 2011, some experts still prefer to use the traditional classification, where all species are placed in Conus within the single family Conidae: for example, according to the current November 2011 version of the World Register of Marine Species, all species within the family Conidae are in the genus Conus. The binomial names of species in the 82 cone snail genera listed in Tucker & Tenorio 2009 are recognized by the World Register of Marine Species as "alternative representations."  Debate within the scientific community regarding this issue continues, and additional molecular phylogeny studies are being carried out in an attempt to clarify the issue.

All this has been superseded in 2015 by the new classification of the Conidae

References

Further reading 
 Kohn A. A. (1992). Chronological Taxonomy of Conus, 1758-1840". Smithsonian Institution Press, Washington and London.
 Monteiro A. (ed.) (2007). The Cone Collector 1: 1-28.
 Berschauer D. (2010). Technology and the Fall of the Mono-Generic Family The Cone Collector 15: pp. 51-54
 Puillandre N., Meyer C.P., Bouchet P., and Olivera B.M. (2011), Genetic divergence and geographical variation in the deep-water Conus orbignyi complex (Mollusca: Conoidea)'', Zoologica Scripta 40(4) 350–363.

External links
 To World Register of Marine Species
  Gastropods.com: Conidae setting forth the genera recognized therein.

Conidae